The Ireland cricket team toured the West Indies in January 2020 to play three One Day International (ODI) and three Twenty20 International (T20I) matches. The West Indies Cricket Board announced the tour dates in September 2019. In November 2019, Andrew Balbirnie was named as Ireland's captain across all three formats of international cricket.

Ahead of the first ODI match, the International Cricket Council (ICC) announced the use of technology to monitor front-foot no-balls for all matches during the tour. The third umpire called the front-foot no-balls, communicating this with the on-field umpires. It was used as a trial to see if it can be implemented further, without a detriment to the flow of the game. The trial was previously used in December 2019, in the matches between India and the West Indies.

The West Indies won the first two ODIs to take an unassailable lead in the series. The West Indies won the third ODI by five wickets, winning the series 3–0. It was the West Indies first ODI series win at home since beating Bangladesh in August 2014. For the first T20I, Jacqueline Williams was named as the third umpire, becoming the first woman to officiate as a third umpire in a men's international cricket match. The T20I series was drawn 1–1, after the second match finished in a no result due to rain.

Squads

Oshane Thomas and Obed McCoy also travelled with the West Indies team for the ODI matches, as part of a development initiative with Cricket West Indies.

Tour match

50-over match: West Indies President's XI vs Ireland

ODI series

1st ODI

2nd ODI

3rd ODI

T20I series

1st T20I

2nd T20I

3rd T20I

References

External links
 Series home at ESPN Cricinfo

2020 in Irish cricket
2020 in West Indian cricket
International cricket competitions in 2019–20
Irish cricket tours of the West Indies